Peter McNamara was the defending champion, but lost in the final to José Higueras. The score was 4–6, 6–7, 7–6, 6–3, 7–6.

Seeds

Draw

Finals

Top half

Section 1

Section 2

Bottom half

Section 3

Section 4

References

External links
 Official results archuve (ATP)
 Official results archive (ITF)

1982 Grand Prix (tennis)